KB Vëllaznimi Gjakovë is a Kosovan basketball team that plays in the Kosovo Superleague. The club is part of the multidisciplinary Vëllaznimi Gjakovë, whose football team is called KF Vëllaznimi and its handball team KH Vëllaznimi.

Honors and titles

 Kosovo Basketball SuperleagueRunners-up (2): 1992, 1995

Kosovo Cup
Winners (3): 1992, 1995, 1996
Kosovo First League
Winners (4): 2004,2013,2020,2022

Current roster

|}
| style="vertical-align:top;" |
Head coach
Franko Sterle 

Assistant coach
Josip Plantak

Legend
(C) Driton Rraci
|}

Depth chart

References

External links
Eurobasket.com Team Profile

Sport in Gjakova
Basketball teams in Yugoslavia
Basketball teams in Kosovo